Channabasappa Sathyappa Shivalli (6 May 1962 - 22 March 2019) was  an Indian politician and member of the Indian National Congress from the state of Karnataka who served as  Minister of Municipalities and Local bodies of Karnataka from 22 December 2018 to 22 March 2019. Shivalli was the Minister in-charge of Municipal administration.

References 

1962 births
2019 deaths
Karnataka MLAs 2018–2023
Indian National Congress politicians from Karnataka
Karnataka MLAs 1999–2004
Karnataka MLAs 2013–2018